= In Defence of Nationality =

1900 pamphlet by Rosa Luxemburg

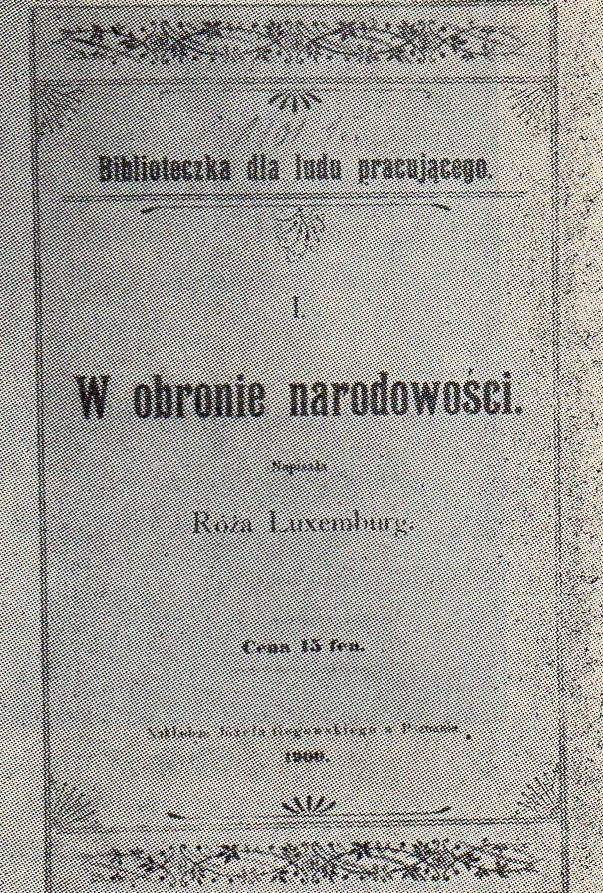

In Defence of Nationality (Polish: W obronie narodowości, German: Zur Verteidigung der Nationalität) was a pamphlet written by Rosa Luxemburg and first published in Poznań in 1900.

== Background ==
Between 1893 and 1900. Luxemburg spoke out against the Germanisation of Polish life in various articles and speeches. One of the events that promoted her to write the pamphlet was the Prussian government’s decision to abolish Polish-language lectures in schools in Poznań.

Although the author questioned the need for Poland to regain independence and believed that from an economic point of view, Polish lands should remain with the partitioning states, she nevertheless argued for the full autonomy of the cultural development of Poles within these countries. In the pamphlet, she argued the right of Poles to cultivate their language and culture, while believing that the creation of antagonisms in this regard is not in the interest of German society, but only of its capitalist elite, who use nationalist conflicts for their political goals.

The publication was intensively distributed in the proletarian milieu of Poznań. The pamphlet resulted in Luxemburg being charged with sedition and she had to appear in court to defend herself.
